Scott St. John (born  in , Ontario, Canada) is a Canadian violinist and violist. He was a member of the St. Lawrence String Quartet (departing December, 2013)  and on faculty at Stanford University, where he taught violin and chamber music.

Biography
St. John was born into a musical family. While his father taught French and Spanish and coached basketball at a high school in nearby Arva, his mother is a music teacher and his younger sister Lara is a violinist.

St. John began violin studies with Richard Lawrence in his home town at age 3, later studying viola.

St. John has won several Canadian and international competitions. In 1985, the CBC Radio National Competition for Young Performers and 3rd place and the audience prize in the Menuhin Competition; in 1987, the Alexander Schneider Violin-Viola Competition in New York City; and, in 1990, the Young Concert Artists auditions.

St. John joined the St. Lawrence String Quartet in September, 2006.

References

External links
Scott St. John's Home Page
St. Lawrence Quartet Home Page

1969 births
Living people
Canadian classical violinists
Male classical violinists
Canadian classical violists
Musicians from London, Ontario
Juno Award for Classical Album of the Year – Large Ensemble or Soloist(s) with Large Ensemble Accompaniment winners
21st-century classical violinists
21st-century Canadian male musicians
20th-century Canadian violinists and fiddlers
21st-century Canadian violinists and fiddlers
Canadian male violinists and fiddlers
20th-century violists
21st-century violists